Eva Birnerová and Lucie Hradecká were the defending champions, but Hradecká chose not to participate.
Birnerová partnered up with Vesna Dolonts, but lost in the final to Mandy Minella and Stefanie Vögele 6–3, 6–2.

Seeds

Draw

Draw
{{16TeamBracket-Compact-Tennis3-Byes
| RD1=First round
| RD2=Quarterfinals
| RD3=Semifinals
| RD4=Finals

| RD1-seed01=1
| RD1-team01= P Martić İ Şenoğlu
| RD1-score01-1=6
| RD1-score01-2=6
| RD1-score01-3= 
| RD1-seed02= 
| RD1-team02= M Auroux N Clerico
| RD1-score02-1=4
| RD1-score02-2=1
| RD1-score02-3= 

| RD1-seed03= 
| RD1-team03=

References
 Main Draw

International Country Cuneo - Doubles